The 2022 Indonesian men's Proliga (or 2022 PLN Mobile Proliga for sponsorship reasons) is the 20th volleyball tournament year and the 18th top level women's volleyball season of the men's Proliga. It is held from January 7 - March 27, 2022.
This season's Proliga will be held with implementing strict health protocols and no attendance, due to the ongoing COVID-19 pandemic in Indonesia.

Location and schedule

Teams

Personnel and kits

Foreign players

Regular season

References 

Volleyball in Indonesia